Newcastle upon Tyne East is a constituency represented in the House of Commons of the UK Parliament by  Nick Brown of the Labour Party. Brown has held the seat since its recreation in 2010.

History
Parliament created this constituency in the Representation of the People Act 1918 as one of four divisions of the parliamentary borough of Newcastle-upon-Tyne, which had previously been represented by one two-member seat. Its first creation was eventually absorbed in 1997 by the new Newcastle upon Tyne East and Wallsend seat.  Parliament accepted the Boundary Commission's Fifth Periodic Review of Westminster constituencies which recommended the re-creation of the seat for the 2010 general election.

Boundaries

1918–1950 

 The County Borough of Newcastle upon Tyne wards of Byker, St Anthony's, St Lawrence, and Walker.

Included the former Urban District of Walker which had been absorbed into the County Borough in 1904 and had previously been part of the abolished Tyneside constituency.

1950–1983 

 The County Borough of Newcastle upon Tyne wards of Dene, Heaton, St Lawrence, Walker, and Walkergate.

Boundaries redrawn to take account of expansion of the County Borough and redistribution of wards. Expanded northwards, gaining Dene and Heaton from Newcastle upon Tyne North. Byker and St Anthony's transferred to Newcastle upon Tyne Central.

1983–1997 

 The City of Newcastle upon Tyne wards of Byker, Dene, Heaton, Monkchester, Sandyford, Walker, and Walkergate.

Regained Byker and St Anthony's with the addition of the Battle Field area from Newcastle-upon-Tyne Centre. Sandyford transferred from Newcastle-upon-Tyne North.

On abolition, the Sandyford ward was transferred to Newcastle upon Tyne Central; the remainder of the constituency comprised the bulk of the new seat of Newcastle upon Tyne East and Wallsend.

2010–present 

 The City of Newcastle upon Tyne wards of Byker, Dene, North Heaton, North Jesmond, Ouseburn, South Heaton, South Jesmond, Walker, and Walkergate.

Following their review of parliamentary representation in Tyne and Wear in 2007, the Boundary Commission for England re-created the constituency of Newcastle upon Tyne East, which took effect at the 2010 general election. The new seat largely replaced the former Newcastle upon Tyne East and Wallsend seat, with the Wallsend element being transferred to the adjacent North Tyneside constituency. The boundaries were similar to those in place before 1997, with the addition of Jesmond from Newcastle upon Tyne Central.

Political History 
Apart from a widespread party defection in 1981 to the SDP, successive members of the Labour Party have represented this constituency in Westminster since 1964 (including its interim successors).  Since 1966, the double-digit majorities won in all three previous forms of the constituency and today's constituency suggest they have been safe seats.

For the Labour Party, it was likely to be more marginal since 2006 when Liberal Democrat local popularity strengthened, winning council seats across the constituency with large majorities. This indicated a possibility of Labour losing the seat to the Liberal Democrats at the 2010 general election. In the event, Labour's Nick Brown held the seat with the smallest majority in 44 years, and in the simultaneous local elections Labour benefitted from the associated increased turnout to take the Walkergate Council Ward from the Liberal Democrats.

In 2015, the Liberal Democrat vote collapsed in line with the rest of the country and in 2017, Brown achieved a record margin of 46.3%. In 2019 the constituency was one of only a handful of Labour-held seats not contested by the Brexit Party.

Members of Parliament

MPs 1918–1997

MPs since 2010

Elections

Elections in the 2010s

 

* Served as MP for Newcastle upon Tyne East and Wallsend, 1997–2010

Elections in the 1990s

Elections in the 1980s

Elections in the 1970s

Elections in the 1960s

Elections in the 1950s

Elections in the 1940s

Elections in the 1930s

Elections in the 1920s

 Death of Joseph Bell

Elections in the 1910s

 Thompson was initially supported by the local branch of the National Federation of Discharged and Demobilized Sailors and Soldiers but this was later revoked.

See also
List of parliamentary constituencies in Tyne and Wear
History of parliamentary constituencies and boundaries in Tyne and Wear
History of parliamentary constituencies and boundaries in Northumberland

Notes

References

Sources
 

Parliamentary constituencies in Tyne and Wear
Constituencies of the Parliament of the United Kingdom established in 1918
Constituencies of the Parliament of the United Kingdom disestablished in 1997
Constituencies of the Parliament of the United Kingdom established in 2010
Politics of Newcastle upon Tyne